Lei is a comune (municipality) in the Province of Nuoro in the Italian region Sardinia, located about  north of Cagliari and about  west of Nuoro.

Lei borders the following municipalities: Bolotana, Silanus.

Demographic evolution

References

External links

Cities and towns in Sardinia